Nemanja Buzadžija (born 16 February 1989) is a Serbian football goalkeeper.

Career
Born in Novi Sad, Buzadžija passed RFK Novi Sad youth categories. After joined the first team, he was loaned to lower ranked clubs Indeks Novi Sad, Sremac Čerević, and Crvena Zvezda Novi Sad. Later, he moved at Indeks Novi Sad for the second time, but as a single player, where he spent a period between 2010 and 2014.

Proleter Novi Sad
Buzadžija joined Proleter Novi Sad for the 2014–15 season under coach Zoran Govedarica. During the first half-season, he was usually used as a reserve goalkeeper for Nemanja Nastić and made 1 appearance, but he got the chance and missed just 1 match in spring half-season, sitting on the bench in the 29 fixture match against Bežanija as a reserve for youth team goalkeeper Miloš Milović. Buzadžija started 2015–16 season as a first choice and made 8 First League appearances but later was replaced on goal by Emil Rockov and spent the rest of season usually as a reserve goalkeeper. After 2 seasons, Buzadžija returned to Indeks in summer 2016.

Career statistics

References

1989 births
Living people
Footballers from Novi Sad
Association football goalkeepers
Serbian footballers
RFK Novi Sad 1921 players
FK Proleter Novi Sad players
Serbian First League players